Avangard-Yugra Kogalym is an ice hockey team in Kogalym, Russia. They play in the Pervaya Liga, the third level of Russian ice hockey. The club was founded in 2009.

External links
 Official site

Ice hockey teams in Russia